Count Johann von Bernstorff may refer to:
Count Johann Heinrich von Bernstorff, the German ambassador to America from 1908 to 1917.
Count Johann Hartwig Ernst von Bernstorff, Danish statesman, chamberlain to the elector of Hanover